Chase Gentry (born March 20, 1997) is an American soccer player who plays as a goalkeeper.

Career

College
Gentry played four years of college soccer at California State University, Dominguez Hills between 2014 and 2017.

Professional
On February 6, 2018, Gentry signed for United Soccer League side Tulsa Roughnecks.

References

External links
 

1997 births
Living people
American soccer players
Cal State Dominguez Hills Toros men's soccer players
FC Tulsa players
Association football goalkeepers
Soccer players from California
USL Championship players